A Night with: The Man with the Chocolate Robe was the title of an event held on December 22, 2005, in honor of former Iranian president Mohammad Khatami after the end of his last term in office.  The controversial ceremony was organized by the weekly magazine Chelcheragh.

External links
BBC News Report
شب یلدای چلچراغ و مردی با عبای شکلاتی – Mohammad Ali Abtahi's story on the event
Chelcheragh Magazine's Web Page on the Event

Politics of Iran
Mohammad Khatami
2005 in Iran